The 2017 Stanley Cup Finals was the championship series of the National Hockey League's (NHL) 2016–17 season, and the culmination of the 2017 Stanley Cup playoffs. The Eastern Conference champion and defending Stanley Cup champion Pittsburgh Penguins defeated the Western Conference champion Nashville Predators, four games to two. Penguins captain Sidney Crosby was awarded the Conn Smythe Trophy as the most valuable player of the playoffs for the second consecutive year. The Penguins won the Stanley Cup in their opponent's rink for the fifth time.

During the regular season, the Penguins finished second in the league with 111 points, which gave them home ice advantage in the series. The series began on May 29 and concluded on June 11. The Penguins made their second consecutive Finals appearance, marking the third time in their history they had done this, following their appearances in – and –. This was the first time since 2009, a rematch between the Penguins and Detroit Red Wings, that any team appeared in consecutive Finals. They also became the fifth franchise to accomplish this feat more than once.

This marked the second consecutive season in which a Western Conference team made their first appearance in the Finals; the San Jose Sharks made their Finals debut the year prior. This was the first time in NHL history that two United States–born head coaches faced off against each other in the Stanley Cup Finals.

The Penguins won the first two games of the series despite being massively outshot by the Predators in both games. Nashville tied the series at two with a pair of convincing wins at home. However, Penguins goaltender Matt Murray shut out the Predators for the remainder of the series. This was the first Final since  in which no game was decided by one goal, and the second Final in three years to have none of its games reach overtime.

Paths to the Finals

Pittsburgh Penguins

 

This was Pittsburgh's second consecutive Finals appearance, and sixth overall. The Penguins did not make any major transactions during the offseason, instead of signing head coach Mike Sullivan to a three-year extension. At the deadline, Pittsburgh acquired defensemen Ron Hainsey and Mark Streit via trade, which proved helpful for depth when star Kris Letang suffered a season-ending injury just weeks before the playoffs started.

Pittsburgh finished with 111 points (50–21–11) during the regular season to finish second in the Metropolitan Division and second overall among playoff teams. Center and team captain Sidney Crosby led the Penguins with 89 points, which ranked second in the league, and won the Rocket Richard Trophy with 44 goals. Phil Kessel led the team in assists with 47.

In the playoffs, the Penguins defeated the Columbus Blue Jackets in five games, eliminated the Presidents' Trophy-winning Washington Capitals for a second consecutive year, this time in seven games, and edged the Ottawa Senators in seven games in the Eastern NHL Conference Finals after Chris Kunitz scored in double overtime of game seven.

Nashville Predators

This was Nashville's first Stanley Cup Finals appearance in its 19-year history.

During the offseason, Nashville traded defenceman and long-time team captain Shea Weber to Montreal for defenceman P. K. Subban, and during the regular season, traded for forwards Cody McLeod and Vernon Fiddler. The Predators also re-signed forward Filip Forsberg during the offseason.

Nashville finished with 94 points (41–29–12) during the regular season to finish as the second wild-card team in the Western Conference, and the 16th overall and last-seeded playoff team. Forsberg and Viktor Arvidsson tied for the team lead in regular-season goal-scoring with 31 each. Ryan Johansen led the team in assists with 47. Arvidsson and Johansen tied for the team lead in points with 61.

The Predators started the playoffs by upsetting the top-seeded Chicago Blackhawks in four games, becoming the second team in NHL history to be the lowest seed in their conference to sweep the top seeded team in the opening round (1993 St. Louis Blues). They followed that up by eliminating the St. Louis Blues and Anaheim Ducks, both in six games. Kevin Fiala and Johansen sustained serious leg injuries in the second and third rounds respectively, and both missed the remainder of the playoffs. The Predators became the third team to be the lowest seed in their conference in NHL history to reach the Stanley Cup Finals, joining the 2006 Edmonton Oilers and the 2012 Los Angeles Kings. The Predators were also the third different franchise that head coach Peter Laviolette led to the Stanley Cup Finals. He won the Cup with the Carolina Hurricanes in 2006, and also took the Philadelphia Flyers to the 2010 Stanley Cup Finals.

Game summaries

Game one

Late in the first period, penalties from Nashville forwards Calle Jarnkrok and James Neal gave Pittsburgh a full two-minute 5-on-3 power play, and Evgeni Malkin scored to make it 1–0. Just 1:15 later, Conor Sheary scored into an open net after a cross-ice pass from Chris Kunitz caught Nashville's defence off guard. In the final seconds of the period, a centring pass from Nick Bonino deflected off Mattias Ekholm and into the net to give Pittsburgh a 3–0 lead. Following Bonino's goal, the Penguins went 37 consecutive minutes without a shot on goal, including the entire second period. The Predators used power-play goals from Ryan Ellis and Colton Sissons to make it 3–2, and Frederick Gaudreau scored immediately following a Penguins power play to tie the game midway through the third. Soon afterwards, Pittsburgh's first shot since the first period resulted in a Jake Guentzel goal to give Pittsburgh the lead again. Bonino scored again into an empty net to clinch the victory for Pittsburgh.

Game two

Midway through the first, the Predators took their first-ever lead in a Stanley Cup Finals game when Pontus Aberg scored around Olli Maatta. The Penguins tied it late in the period when a Guentzel tip sneaked past Pekka Rinne. After a scoreless second period in which the Predators took twice as many shots as the Penguins, Pittsburgh came out firing in the third, scoring three goals in 3:18. The first was Guentzel's twelfth of the playoffs, making him the first rookie since Dino Ciccarelli to score twelve times in a single postseason. The next two goals came 15 seconds apart and prompted Predators head coach Peter Laviolette to replace Rinne with backup Juuse Saros. Nashville never cut into the deficit as Pittsburgh won the game by 4–1.

Game three

Jake Guentzel came within one goal of Dino Ciccarelli's rookie playoff record when a shot 2:46 into the game got past Pekka Rinne. In the second period, Roman Josi and Frederick Gaudreau scored only 42 seconds apart to quickly give Nashville the lead. Neal scored with 23 seconds left in the second to give the Predators a two-goal lead. In the third period, a breakaway by Craig Smith and a goal by Ekholm provided insurance in a 5–1 victory for Nashville. Near the end of the game, several misconducts were assessed after a cross checking by Phil Kessel drew a crowd and fights broke out.

Game four

Calle Jarnkrok gave Nashville an early lead, but a breakaway goal by Sidney Crosby tied the score at one. In the second period, after a Penguins breakaway was stopped by Rinne, Gaudreau's wrap-around shot appeared to be stopped by Matt Murray, but video review showed the puck sneak under Murray's paddle and across the goal line before Murray sent it back out. A breakaway goal by Viktor Arvidsson gave the Predators their third goal of the game. Rinne would stop all nine shots faced in the third period and an empty-net goal by Filip Forsberg gave Nashville a 4–1 win and tied the series 2–2.

Game five

Justin Schultz scored for Pittsburgh early in the first period on the power play. Two more goals from the Penguins caused Nashville to again replace Rinne with Saros in net to start the second period. Pittsburgh scored three more times in the second, the first from Conor Sheary. Guentzel assisted on Sheary's goal, tying the rookie record for points in a single postseason (21). Kessel and Ron Hainsey scored the last of Pittsburgh's six goals; Kessel and Crosby both ended the game with three points. Neither team scored in the third period, making Matt Murray the first rookie since Cam Ward in 2006 to record a shutout in the Stanley Cup Finals. During the third period, 20 penalties were assessed, the most in one period since the third game of the 2011 Stanley Cup Finals.

Game six

The game remained scoreless until the final two minutes of the third period when former Predator Patric Hornqvist scored with 1:35 left in the game. Nashville challenged for goaltender interference, but the on-ice ruling was upheld. Carl Hagelin added an empty net goal with 15 seconds remaining. Sidney Crosby was awarded the Conn Smythe Trophy as MVP of the playoffs for the second consecutive season.

During the second period, a quick whistle prevented a Predators' scoring chance that almost certainly would have resulted in a goal. Referee Kevin Pollock thought Matt Murray had covered a Filip Forsberg shot, but the puck was, in fact, loose in the goal crease, when Colton Sissons tapped it in.

Team rosters

Nashville Predators

Pittsburgh Penguins

Stanley Cup engraving
The 2017 Stanley Cup was presented to Penguins captain Sidney Crosby by NHL Commissioner Gary Bettman following the Penguins 2–0 win over the Predators in game six

The following Penguins players and staff had their names engraved on the Stanley Cup

2016–17 Pittsburgh Penguins

Other eligible players
 #58 Kris Letang (D) – played 41 regular-season games, missed 41 regular-season games and all 25 playoff games due to injury – qualifies for playing half the regular season games.
 #65 Ron Hainsey (D) – played 56 games for Carolina, 16 regular season and 25 playoff games for Pittsburgh – qualifies for playing in the finals
 #32 Mark Streit (D) – played 49 games for Philadelphia, 19 regular-season games and three playoff games for Pittsburgh (all three in the Conference Finals) – did not automatically qualify but the name was engraved
 #37 Carter Rowney (RW) – played 27 regular-season and 20 playoff games for Pittsburgh – qualifies for playing in the finals.
 #45 Josh Archibald (RW) – played 61 games in AHL, 10 regular-season and four playoff games for Pittsburgh (three in the Conference Finals, one in the Finals) – qualifies for playing in the finals
 #2 Chad Ruhwedel (D) – played 34 regular-season games and 11 playoff games. (plus 27 games in the minors). Missed last 2 games of Conference and all 6 games of the finals due to a concussion. No injury exemption, left off the cup.
 #35 Tristan Jarry (G) – dressed for 11 playoff games while Matt Murray was injured (Jarry received his second Stanley Cup ring, despite only playing one NHL game) – name not engraved on Cup

Engraving notes
The Penguins fill the last spot on the bottom ring of the Stanley Cup. The top ring, featuring winners from 1954 to 1965, was removed after the Capitals were added in 2018. 
Included in the team picture, but left off of the Stanley Cup.
Alex Trinca (Strength & Conditioning Coach) (on Cup in 2016)
Danny Kroll (Assistant Equipment Manager) (on Cup in 2009)
Sergei Gonchar was left off of the Cup in 2016. In 2017, Gonchar was included, and Alex Trinca was left off.

Television and radio
In Canada, the series was broadcast by Sportsnet and simulcast by CBC Television in English, and TVA Sports in French. In the U.S., NBC broadcast most of the games; games two and three were aired by NBCSN. In the U.S., the games were seen by an average of 4.762 million viewers, an increase of 19% over the 2016 finals, and the highest-rated finals without an Original Six team. Despite competition from the 2017 Tony Awards broadcast and the return of ABC's Sunday-night game show block, game six achieved a total viewership of 7.086 million.

The NHL on Westwood One/NBC Sports Radio carried the games throughout the United States on radio and through online streaming, while the home calls of Nashville (WPRT-FM/Predators Radio Network) and Pittsburgh (WXDX-FM/Penguins Radio Network) was available both over the air in their home markets and through online streaming.

References

Navigation

Stanley Cup Finals
 
Stanley Cup Finals
Nashville Predators games
Stanley Cup Finals
Stanley Cup Finals
Pittsburgh Penguins games
Stanley Cup Finals
Ice hockey competitions in Pittsburgh
2010s in Pittsburgh
Stanley Cup Finals
Stanley Cup Finals
Ice hockey competitions in Tennessee